E. rosea may refer to:
 Ecdysanthera rosea, a plant species now known as Urceola rosea
 Eria rosea, an orchid species
 Euglandina rosea, the rosy wolfsnail or the cannibal snail, a large predatory air-breathing land snail species

See also
 Rosea (disambiguation)